Jihan Malla is a Lebanese Television personality and voice actress.

Filmography

Animation 
 Batman: The Animated Series (Lebanese dub) 
 Over the Garden Wall
 Matt Hatter Chronicles - Meg
 Mr. Bean - Mrs. Juila Wicket
 Teen Titans Go! - Gizmo (Cartoon Network Arabic version), Jinx (MBC3 version)
 Steven Universe - Ruby (Jail Break episode)
 The Amazing World of Gumball - Nicole Watterson
 Uncle Grandpa
 The Fairly OddParents - Wanda (Classical Arabic version)

Films 
 Big Hero 6 - Honey Lemon
 Finding Nemo - Peach (Classical Arabic version)
 Inside Out - Joy
 Lilo & Stitch 2: Stitch Has a Glitch (Classical Arabic version)
 Mars Needs Moms - The Supervisor
 Monsters University - Carrie Williams, Roz
 Monsters, Inc. (Classical Arabic version)
 The Great Mouse Detective (Classical Arabic version)
 The Incredibles - Mirage (Classical Arabic version)
 Toy Story 2 (Classical Arabic version, uncredited)

Video games 
Assassin's Creed: Syndicate (credited as Jihane Malla)
Tom Clancy's The Division (credited as Jihane Malla)

References 

Lebanese voice actresses